The Watts River is a perennial river of the Port Phillip and Western Port catchment, located in the Healesville area, in the Central region of the Australian state of Victoria.

Location and features
The river flows generally south, then north-west, then south-west, where it is impounded by the Maroondah Dam to create the  Maroondah Reservoir. After flowing over the dam spillway, the river flows generally west by south, joined by Meyers Creek, before reaching its confluence with the Yarra River south of Healesville. The river descends  over its  course.

Watts River became part of Melbourne's water supply system in 1891, with the construction of a diversion weir and the Maroondah Aqueduct. At that time, the catchments were closed and cleared of human habitation. The river was dammed in 1927 to form the Maroondah Reservoir, which is largely contained in the forested reservoir catchment within the Yarra Ranges National Park.

The river is traversed by the Maroondah Highway, upriver of the Maroondah Reservoir.

Naming
In the Aboriginal Woiwurrung language, the name of the river is Broong-ku-galk, with galk meaning "timber" or "sticks".

The European name derives from the surname of a stockman who drowned in the river in about 1843.

See also

 Geography of the Yarra River
 Rivers of Victoria

References

External links
 Port Phillip & Westernport Catchment Management Authority website

Melbourne Water catchment
Rivers of Greater Melbourne (region)
Tributaries of the Yarra River